Maher Hreitani (born 6 March 1954) is a Syrian hurdler. He competed in the men's 110 metres hurdles at the 1980 Summer Olympics.

References

1954 births
Living people
Athletes (track and field) at the 1980 Summer Olympics
Syrian male hurdlers
Olympic athletes of Syria
Place of birth missing (living people)
20th-century Syrian people